Guam competed at the 2015 World Championships in Athletics in Beijing, China, from 22–30 August 2015.

Guamanian national record holder Regine Tugade, a high school senior at the time, was the only athlete from Guam to compete, and her only event was the women's 100m. Knowing that she would be the only Guam athlete, as was the case when she competed in the 2015 World Youth Championships in Athletics weeks before, she said her goal was just to set a personal record. Not having suitable training partners to meet with, Tugade trained largely alone for the race, arriving to her track at 5:30 a.m. on weekdays to prepare before her classes started. After classes ended, Tugade trained with the Guam Central Athletics Club for this race.

Tugade traveled with a larger Oceania team to the Games, sponsored by the Guam Track & Field Association. Though she qualified for both the 100m and 200m in the earlier World Youth Games, her 200m sprint time was "far from qualifying" in the senior championships so she decided split the events, doing the 200m at World Youths and saving the 100m for senior Worlds.

She finished in sixth place in heat five failing to qualify for the semifinals, her mark of 12.60 seconds placing her 51st overall by time. Though the time was 0.34 seconds off her own  and national record, it was only 0.05 seconds off Polara Cobb's previous national record in this event set at the same race four years ago.

Her decision to run the World Championships rather than the more regional Pacific Games in Papua New Guinea that year was questioned. She decided to run the more competitive senior world championships instead, saying "It was a late notice and if I wanted to go I would have to raise $2000 on my own."

Though her run was not competitive with other nations, it was her only global senior championship before being recruited for the U.S. Naval Academy in Annapolis, Maryland to run track and field. Guam Delegate Madeleine Bordallo said of Tugade following the decision, "She has made Guam proud in international sports competitions."

Results
(q – qualified, NM – no mark, SB – season best)

Women
Track and road events

References 

Nations at the 2015 World Championships in Athletics
World Championships in Athletics
Guam at the World Championships in Athletics